Raven Klaasen and Marcelo Melo were the defending champions, but decided not to participate together. Klaasen teamed up with Rajeev Ram, but they lost to Jo-Wilfried Tsonga and Nenad Zimonjić in the second round. Melo played alongside Łukasz Kubot, but they lost to Pablo Cuevas and Marcel Granollers in the second round.

John Isner and Jack Sock won the title, defeating Henri Kontinen and John Peers in the final, 6–4, 6–4.

Seeds
All seeds received a bye into the second round.

Draw

Finals

Top half

Bottom half

References
 Main Draw

Doubles